Clearview is a town in Okfuskee County, Oklahoma, United States. The population was 56 at the 2000 census. It was historically an all-black freedmen's town and was platted by the Lincoln Townsite Company and designated as Lincoln.

Geography

Demographics

As of the census of 2000, there were 56 people, 24 households, and 13 families residing in the town. There were 34 housing units at an average density of 194.7 per square mile (77.2/km2). The racial makeup of the town was 7.14% White, 75.00% African American, 12.50% Native American, and 5.36% from two or more races.

There were 24 households, out of which 25.0% had children under the age of 18 living with them, 29.2% were married couples living together, 20.8% had a female householder with no husband present, and 45.8% were non-families. 45.8% of all households were made up of individuals, and 41.7% had someone living alone who was 65 years of age or older. The average household size was 2.33 and the average family size was 3.31.

In the town, the population was spread out, with 26.8% under the age of 18, 5.4% from 18 to 24, 30.4% from 25 to 44, 16.1% from 45 to 64, and 21.4% who were 65 years of age or older. The median age was 38 years. For every 100 females, there were 75.0 males. For every 100 females age 18 and over, there were 78.3 males.

The median income for a household in the town was $16,250, and the median income for a family was $22,500. Males had a median income of $62,500 versus $16,250 for females. The per capita income for the town was $11,607. There were 20.0% of families and 40.7% of the population living below the poverty line, including 52.9% under eighteen and 58.3% over 64.

See also
 Boley, Brooksville, Grayson, Langston, Lima, Redbird, Rentiesville, Summit, Taft, Tatums, Tullahassee, and Vernon, other "All-Black" settlements that were part of the Land Run of 1889.

References

External links
 Encyclopedia of Oklahoma History and Culture - Clearview
All-Black Towns in Oklahoma

African-American history of Oklahoma
Freedmen's towns
Towns in Okfuskee County, Oklahoma
Towns in Oklahoma
Populated places in Oklahoma established by African Americans
Pre-statehood history of Oklahoma